Fabio  is a given name descended from Latin Fabius and very popular in Italy and Latin America (due to Italian migration). Its English equivalent is Fabian.

The name is written without an accent in Italian and Spanish, but is usually accented in Portuguese as Fábio (with the diminutive Fabinho or Fabiano). The presence or absence of the written accent does not affect pronunciation.

First name

A–K
 Fabio (DJ), drum-and-bass DJ and producer from the UK
 Fabio Armiliato (born 1956), Italian operatic tenor
 Fábio Aurélio (born 1979), Brazilian footballer
 Fábio Bahia (Fábio Júnior Nascimento Santana, born 1983), currently playing for Goiás
 Fabio Bencivenga, Italian water polo player
 Jud "Fabio" Birza, winner of Survivor: Nicaragua
 Fabio Borini, Italian footballer
 Fábio Camilo de Brito (Nenê, born 1975), currently playing for Coritiba Foot Ball Club
 Fabio Cannavaro,  former captain of the Italy national team
 Fabio Capello, Italian manager of the Russian national association football team
 Fábio Costa (born 1977), Brazilian footballer
 Fábio Eduardo Cribari (born 1975), Brazilian footballer, better known as Binho
 Fabio Fognini (born 1987), Italian tennis player
 Fábio Gonçalves dos Santos (born 1978), Brazilian footballer 
 Fábio Pereira da Cruz (born 1979), Brazilian footballer
 Fabio Díez (born 1965), Argentinian-Spanish beach volleyball player
 Fabio Duarte, Colombian track and road cyclist
 Fabio Frizzi (born 1951), Italian film composer
 Fabio De Gaspari (born 1966), Italian javelin thrower
 Fábio Gilvan do Nascimento Silva (born 1983), Brazilian footballer
 Fabio Grosso, Italian footballer
 Fábio Henrique Tavares (born 1993), Brazilian footballer, currently playing for Liverpool
 Fabio Jaramillo, Colombian cyclist
 Fábio Jr., a Brazilian singer and musician
 Fábio Kolling (born 1985), Brazilian footballer

L–Z
 Fábio Lago, Brazilian actor
 Fabio Lanzoni, Italian , generally known as simply Fabio
 Fábio Lefundes, Brazilian football manager
 Fabio Lione, Italian vocalist of Rhapsody of Fire
 Fábio Deivson Lopes Maciel (born 1980), Brazilian footballer, currently playing for Cruzeiro
 Fabio Lopez (born 1973), Italian football manager
 Fábio Luciano (born 1975), Brazilian footballer
 Fábio Luiz Magalhães, Brazilian beach volleyball player 
 Fábio Freire Martins (born 1989), Brazilian footballer
 Fabio Morábito (born 1955), Mexican poet
 Fabio Mussi (born 1948), Italian politician
 Fabio Ochoa Restrepo, Colombian businessman and patriarch of the Ochoa drug-trafficking family
 Fabio Ochoa Vásquez, Colombian drug lord 
 Fabio Ongaro, Italian rugby player
 Fábio Pereira da Silva (born 1990), Brazilian footballer, twin brother of Rafael
 Fabio Petruzzi (born 1970), Italian footballer
 Fabio Pignatelli, bassist for the Italian progressive rock band Goblin
 Fabio Quagliarella, Italian footballer
 Fabio Quartararo, French Grand Prix motorcycle racer
 Fabio Ribotta (born 1998), Italian curler
 Fabio Rovazzi (born 1994), Italian rapper and actor
 Fábio José dos Santos (born 1973), Brazilian footballer
 Fábio Souza de Oliveira (born 1984), Brazilian footballer
 José Fábio da Silva (born 1984), Brazilian football right-back
 Fabio Semenzato, Italian rugby player
 Fábio de Souza (Fabinho), Brazilian footballer
 Fabio Viviani (chef), placed fourth and earned the title of "fan favorite" in season 5 of Bravo reality show competition Top Chef
 Fabio Viviani (footballer) (born 1966), Italian footballer

Last name
 João Paulo di Fabio (born 1979), Italian-Brazilian football defender
 José Fabio (born 1977), Paraguayan basketball player

See also
 Fabinho (disambiguation)
 Fábio Júnior (disambiguation)
 Fábio Lopes (disambiguation)
 Fabio Santos (disambiguation)
 Fábio Silva (disambiguation)
 Fabius (disambiguation)

 
 

Italian masculine given names
Portuguese masculine given names
Sammarinese given names
Spanish masculine given names